Piazza della Signoria is a w-shaped square in front of the Palazzo Vecchio in Florence, Italy. It was named after the Palazzo della Signoria, also called Palazzo Vecchio. It is the main point of the origin and history of the Florentine Republic and still maintains its reputation as the political focus of the city. It is the meeting place of Florentines as well as the numerous tourists, located near Palazzo Vecchio and Piazza del Duomo and gateway to Uffizi Gallery.

Buildings
The impressive 14th-century Palazzo Vecchio is still preeminent with its crenellated tower. The square is also shared with the Loggia della Signoria, the Uffizi Gallery, the Palace of the Tribunale della Mercanzia (1359) (now the Bureau of Agriculture), and the Palazzo Uguccioni (1550, with a facade attributed to Raphael, who however died thirty years before its construction). Located in front of the Palazzo Vecchio is the Palace of the Assicurazioni Generali (1871, built in Renaissance style).

Palazzo Vecchio

The Palazzo Vecchio ("Old Palace") is the town hall of the city. This massive, Romanesque, crenellated fortress-palace is among the most impressive town halls of Tuscany. Overlooking the square with its copy of Michelangelo's David statue as well the gallery of statues in the adjacent Loggia dei Lanzi, it is one of the most significant private places in Italy, and it hosts cultural points and museums.

Originally called the Palazzo della Signoria, after the Signoria of Florence, the ruling body of the Republic of Florence, it was also given several other names: Palazzo del Popolo, Palazzo dei Priori, and Palazzo Ducale, in accordance with the varying use of the palace during its long history. The building acquired its current name when the Medici duke's residence was moved across the Arno to the Palazzo Pitti.

Loggia dei Lanzi

The Loggia dei Lanzi consists of wide arches open to the street, three bays wide and one bay deep. The arches rest on clustered columns with Corinthian capitals. The wide arches appealed so much to the Florentines, that Michelangelo even proposed that they should be continued all around the Piazza della Signoria. The vivacious construction of the Loggia is in stark contrast with the severe architecture of the Palazzo Vecchio. It is effectively an open-air sculpture gallery of antique and Renaissance art including the Medici lions.

Tribunale della Mercanzia
The Tribunale della Mercanzia (Tribunal of Merchandise) is a building where in the past lawyers judged in the trial between merchants. Here was a porch painted by Taddeo Gaddi, Antonio del Pollaiuolo and Sandro Botticelli, today stored in the Uffizi gallery.

Palazzo Uguccioni
Built for Giovanni Uguccioni since 1550, its design has been variously attributed to Raphael, Michelangelo, Bartolomeo Ammannati or Raffaello da Montelupo.

Palazzo delle Assicurazioni Generali
The Palazzo delle Assicurazioni Generali was designed in the Neo-Renaissance style in 1871, and is one of the very few purpose-built commercial buildings in the centre of the city. On the ground floor of this palace is the historical cafè Rivoire.

Other palaces
Other palaces are the palazzo dei Buonaguisi and the palazzo dell'Arte dei Mercatanti.

Statues

Various imposing statues ring this square including: 
Copy of Michelangelo's David. at the entrance of the Palazzo Vecchio; the original by Michelangelo is housed in the Galleria dell'Accademia, adjacent to the Gallery of the Academy of Fine Arts.
Equestrian Monument of Cosimo I, honoring Cosimo I de' Medici and sculpted by Giambologna (1594)
Fountain of Neptune by Bartolomeo Ammannati (1575)
Il Marzocco, (the Lion) with a copy of the Florentine Lily, originally made by Donatello (copy)
Judith and Holofernes, by Donatello (copy)
Hercules and Cacus, by Bandinelli (1533)
The Rape of the Sabine Women, in the Loggia dei Lanzi by Giambologna (1583) 
Perseus with the Head of Medusa, in the Loggia dei Lanzi by Cellini (1554)
Medici lions, by Fancelli and Vacca (1598)

The piazza was already a central square in the original Roman town Florentia, surrounded by a theatre, Roman baths and a workshop for dyeing textiles. Later there was a church San Romolo, a loggia and an enormous 5th-century basilica. This was shown by the archaeological treasures found beneath the square when it was repaved in the 1980s. Even remains of a Neolithic site were found. The square started taking shape from 1268 on, when houses of Ghibellines were pulled down by the victorious Guelphs. The square remained a long time untidy, full of holes. In 1385 it was paved for the first time. In 1497 Girolamo Savonarola and his followers carried out on this square the famous Bonfire of the Vanities, burning in a large pile books, gaming tables, fine dresses, and works of poets. In front of the fountain of Neptune, a round marble plaque marks the exact spot where Girolamo Savonarola was hanged and burned on May 23, 1498.

Gallery

References

Further reading

External links

Virtual Tour of Piazza della Signoria

Signoria
Uffizi
Articles containing video clips